Panama is scheduled to compete at the 2023 Pan American Games in Santiago, Chile from October 20 to November 5, 2023. This was Panama's 19th appearance at the Pan American Games, having competed at every edition of the games.

Competitors
The following is the list of number of competitors (per gender) participating at the games per sport/discipline.

Boxing

Panama qualified one female boxer by reaching the final of the 2022 South American Games.

Women

Fencing

Panama qualified one female fencer through the 2022 Pan American Fencing Championships in Asuncion, Paraguay.

Individual

Shooting

Panama qualified a total of four shooters in the 2022 Americas Shooting Championships.

Men
Shotgun

See also
Panama at the 2024 Summer Olympics

References

Nations at the 2023 Pan American Games
2023
2023 in Panamanian sport